Jesse Chickering (born Dover, New Hampshire, 31 August 1797; died West Roxbury, Massachusetts, 29 May 1855) was a political economist. He was graduated at Harvard in 1818, studied theology, and became a Unitarian minister. He afterward pursued a medical course, receiving his diploma in 1833, and practised medicine for about ten years in Boston and West Roxbury.

Works
 Statistical View of the Population of Massachusetts from 1765 to 1840 (Boston, 1846)
 Emigration into the United States (1848)
 Reports on the Census of Boston (1851)
 Letter addressed to the President of the United States on Slavery, considered in Relation to the Principles of Constitutional Government in Great Britain and in the United States (1855)

Notes

References

External links
 Register of the Jesse Chickering Papers, 1805-1919. Rubenstein Rare Book and Manuscript Library, Duke University.

1797 births
1855 deaths
American economists
19th-century Unitarian clergy
American Unitarians
Physicians from Massachusetts
Harvard University alumni